Alonzo Smith (August 9, 1842 - January 17, 1927) was an American soldier who fought for the Union Army during the American Civil War. He received the Medal of Honor for valor.

Biography
Smith served in the American Civil War in the 7th Michigan Volunteer Infantry Regiment. He received the Medal of Honor on December 1, 1864 for his actions at the Battle of Boydton Plank Road on October 27, 1864.

Medal of Honor citation

Citation:

Capture of flag of 26th North Carolina Infantry (C.S.A.), while outside his lines far from his comrades.

See also

List of American Civil War Medal of Honor recipients: Q-S

References

External links

Military Times

1842 births
1927 deaths
Union Army soldiers
United States Army Medal of Honor recipients
American Civil War recipients of the Medal of Honor